Bushra (Bishra) is a town in the Irbid Governorate, Jordan. It is located East of the municipality and town of Irbid 3 km, to the North by the towns of Hakama and Beit Ras (Roman kabitalios), to the South by the town of Huwwarah and to the East by the town of Sal.

Geography
The town is part of Hauran. The red soils of the region are very fertile land for growing grain. The town is on a small hill called Tal - Mehrez, southern valley. The valley of the Alroish ends in the Rahaub Valley, which empties in the Yarmouk River.

Area soils are white gray, and the region contains some caves, some of which are spread around the Grand Mosque, which was demolished after the male secondary school building in 1986. The territory divides into thirteen basins, including Aargom blacks, Doghaim, cave, door, Alborea, fronting, busia, giadp, corsage, broadcloth, Alden, slick and Baydar.

History

The villagers paid a fixed tax-rate of 25%  on various  agricultural products, including wheat, barley, summer crops, goats and beehives, in addition to  occasional revenues; a total of  4,876 akçe. 1/4 of the revenue went to a waqf.

In 1838 Bushra was reported to be in ruins.

Population

In 1961 the population of Bushra was 1,560 inhabitants;  768 males and 792 females. By 2005, the population had grown to 11,996, in which 6,150 were male and 5,642 were female. More recently in 2015, the population was 19,444 inhabitants with 9568 female and 9876 male, mostly all of the people there are Muslims. Bushra supports a population of minority Christians, who have roots in the town for more than 130 years.

Volunteer work
Bushra youth volunteer work - an independent group of its youth  who have volunteered to serve their town and advancement at all levels and in various fields. Projects include:
Cleaning the streets and sidewalks and the mosques of the town, and planting areas and exploited optimally.
Increase awareness among school and university students and townspeople of the importance of public ownership.
Campaigns and support healthy of rhyme and sports projects in the town.

References

Bibliography

External links

GIS

 Bushra Youth Volunteers   -- https://www.facebook.com/shababboshra

Villages in Irbid governorate